Gourd is a plant of the family Cucurbitaceae, and/or its fruit.

Gourd may also refer to:

 The Gourds, a musical group
 List of gourds and squashes, species in the genus Cucurbita
 Gourd Lake, a lake in Minnesota
 Loaded dice
 Penis gourd, a type of penis sheath.

See also
Gourde (disambiguation)